"4 da Fam" is a song by American rapper Amil, featuring verses from American rappers Jay-Z, Memphis Bleek, and Beanie Sigel. Ty Fyffe produced the song. It was released on Roc-A-Fella as the second single from her debut album All Money Is Legal. In the song's lyrics, Amil boasts about being the best female rapper, and Jay-Z discusses his fears of becoming a father, which his verse suggests he believed was about to occur at the time.

"4 da Fam" received mixed reviews from music critics; some critics praised Jay-Z's verse, while others criticized Amil's contributions. It appeared on several Billboard charts. The song peaked at  99 on the Hot R&B/Hip-Hop Songs Billboard chart and No. 97 on the Hot Rap Songs Billboard chart. "4 da Fam"  was promoted with a music video, which was played on the music show Artist Corner and the BET network.

Recording and release 
Ty Fyffe produced "4 da Fam" and wrote it with Amil Whitehead, Shawn Carter (Jay-Z), Dwight Grant (Beanie Sigel), and Malik Cox (Memphis Bleek). The track was mixed by Pat Viala and recorded by Just Blaze. It was released on September 13, 2000 as the second single from Amil's debut album, All Money Is Legal (2000). The song was made available as a 12-inch single through Roc-A-Fella. It was also included on a double A-side with the album's lead single "I Got That". In advertisements for All Money Is Legal, "4 da Fam" was promoted as one of its "blazin' joints".

A music video, directed by Nick Quested, was released for "4 da Fam" in 2000. It was played that year on the music show Artist Corner and BET. The video was uploaded to Amil's Vevo account on October 25, 2009.

Composition and lyrics 
At 4 minutes and 19 seconds long, "4 da Fam" includes verses from Amil, Jay-Z, Memphis Bleek, and Beanie Sigel. Steve Rivers of Ebony described it as a "crew love record". In her part, Amil brags about her career through the lyrics: "I'm the illest female that you heard thus far." In his verse,  Jay-Z raps about becoming a father in the verse: "I got four nephews and they're all writing ... and I'm having a child, which is more frightening." Rob Markman of MTV News wrote that fatherhood was a subject that Jay-Z explored from his debut album Reasonable Doubt (1996). Jay-Z's other lyrics include: "Y'all niggas truly ain't ready for this dynasty thing / Y'all thinking Blake Carrington, I'm thinking more like Ming." and "I got 4 nephews, and they all write-ing / They all young and wild, plus they all like Beans."

Reception 
"4 da Fam" received mixed reviews from music critics. Andrew Barber and Al Shipley of Complex praised Jay-Z's contribution, and wrote that "he had the best verse and batted clean up". In a 2018 article, they included "4 da Fam" in their list of the top-100 best Jay-Z songs. John Kennedy of Vulture.com identified the single as an improvement over the track "Pop 4 Roc" from Jay-Z's fourth studio album Vol. 3... Life and Times of S. Carter (1999), and described "4 da Fam" as "the real deal". While critical of Amil, Son Raw of Fact referred to the single as a "prime Roc La Familia-era posse cut". A writer for Bossip criticized Amil's verse, and included her boast as the best female rapper on their list of the top-ten greatest lies in hip hop music.

"4 da Fam" peaked at  99 on the Hot R&B/Hip-Hop Songs Billboard chart on July 22, 2000, and remained on the chart for a week. On the same day, it reached a peak position of No. 97 on the R&B/Hip-Hop Streaming Songs Billboard chart, staying on the chart for a week. It also peaked at No. 29 on the Hot Rap Songs Billboard chart, and remained on that chart for 11 weeks.

Track listings

Credits and personnel 
Credits adapted from the liner notes of All Money Is Legal:

Featuring – Beanie Sigel, Jay-Z, Memphis Bleek
Mixed by – Pat Viala
Producer – Ty Tyfife
Recorded by – Just Blaze
Written by – Ty Tyfife, Amil Whitehead, Shawn Carter, Dwight Grant, and Malik Cox

Charts

Release history

Notes

References

External links 

2000 singles
Amil songs
Beanie Sigel songs
Jay-Z songs
Memphis Bleek songs
Songs written by Jay-Z
2000 songs
Songs written by Amil